Dadswells Bridge is a town in Victoria, Australia, located along the Western Highway in the Wimmera region. At the 2021 census, Dadswells Bridge had a population of 69.

The town has been threatened by major bushfires and grassfires, most recently in 2010 and 2014.

The town seems to be wrapped around the Grampians, with vital tracks as well as the Western Highway briefly entering and exiting the Shire of Northern Grampians from the Rural City of Horsham, which tightly excludes the Grampians from its boundaries.

References

External links

Wimmera